Bocchoris pulverealis is a moth in the family Crambidae. It was described by George Hampson in 1898. It is found on Java.

The wingspan is about 20 mm. The wings are fuscous, irrorated (sprinkled) with yellowish white. There are numerous semihyaline white spots on the basal two-thirds of the forewings. The hindwings have a similar subbasal, medial and postmedial series of spots.

References

Moths described in 1898
Spilomelinae